Shawqi Abdul Amir (12 September 1949) is an Iraqi poet and former diplomat. Born in Nassiriyah, he received his master's degree in comparative literature from the Sorbonne in 1974. He worked as a teacher in Algeria, joined journalism and cultural affairs and worked as a press consultant at the South Yemen Embassy in Paris and been director of the Yemeni Cultural Center in Paris since 1991. He founded Kitâb fî Jarîda in 1995 to make literature freely available to individuals and households across the Arab world, particularly those who lack the financial means to buy books.

Life 
He was born in Nassiriyah on 12 September 1949. He received his MA in Comparative Literature from the Sorbonne University in Paris in 1974. He worked as a teacher for a period in Algeria, then moved to journalism and cultural work. He was appointed editor-in-chief of Le Monde Arabe
(?) in the French press, and worked as a press consultant at Embassy of the People's Democratic Republic of Yemen in Paris. Worked in the field of international relations of UNESCO, became an expert in international cultural relations for 10 years, and the Iraqi cultural advisor at the UNESCO, founded the Kitâb fî Jarîda project, the largest Arab cultural project under the auspices of UNESCO.
He spent 35 years in exile between Algeria, Yemen and Paris, until he settled in Beirut, Lebanon.

Poetry works

References 

University of Paris alumni
Iraqi diplomats
20th-century Iraqi poets
21st-century Iraqi poets
20th-century Iraqi journalists
Iraqi emigrants to France
Iraqi emigrants to Lebanon
1949 births
People from Nasiriyah
Iraqi emigrants to Algeria
Iraqi schoolteachers
Iraqi emigrants to Yemen
Living people